The 2002 Algerian Cup Final was the 38th final of the Algerian Cup. The final took place on July 5, 2002, at May 19, 1956 Stadium in Annaba with kick-off at 16:00. WA Tlemcen beat MC Oran 1–0 to win their second Algerian Cup. The competition winners were awarded a berth in the 2003 African Cup Winners' Cup.

Pre-match

Details

References

Algerian Cup Finals